Dionisio Fernández can refer to:

 Dionisio Fernández (boxer), Spanish boxer
 Dionisio Fernández (sport shooter), Argentine sport shooter